Thakore is the name of:

 Anand Thakore (born 1971), Indian poet and Hindustani classical vocalist
 Balwantray Thakore (1869–1952), Indian poet and playwright
 Dolly Thakore (born 1943), Indian actress

See also 
 
 Thakor, a subcaste of Koli community of Gujarat
 Thakor (name), including a list of people with the name
 Thakur (title), a historical feudal title of the Indian subcontinent
 Thakore Saheb of Rajkot